Somerby is a village and civil parish in the Melton district, in the county of Leicestershire, England. The population of the civil parish at the 2011 census was 812.

Somerby is a small country village containing a parish church (All Saints), a primary school, a Doctor's surgery, a pub, a small shop/post office, and a large Equestrian Centre. The population is close to 500. It is the largest village in the parish of Somerby and is located in East Leicestershire close to the border with Rutland; the parish also includes the settlements of Burrough on the Hill, Leesthorpe and Pickwell.

The surrounding countryside is very attractive and is often referred to as 'High Leicestershire'. Much of the Parish is several hundred feet above sea level and there are often superb views to be found. Although predominantly a rural community there are a significant number of successful business enterprises in the local area.

During World War II, the village was used as a base station and testing ground for  Operation Market Garden, the airborne attack on Arnhem.

It was in the parish of Somerby (but the village of Burrough on the Hill) that the surgeon William Cheselden was born.

See also
John O' Gaunt

References

External links

 
Villages in Leicestershire
Civil parishes in Leicestershire
Borough of Melton